University City High School (UCHS) is a public high school in University City, Missouri, United States, that is part of the School District of University City. 

As part of the University City Education District, the high school building was listed, along with nearby Jackson Park Elementary School and Hanley Junior High School, in the National Register of Historic Places on January 31, 1985.

Notable alumni

David Bass, NFL football player
Bud Black, major-league pitcher
Harold Brodkey, writer
Jeremy Davenport, jazz musician
Bing Devine, General Manager of the St. Louis Cardinals
Marty Ehrlich, jazz musician
Malcolm Frager, pianist
Bob Gale, screenwriter, author, movie producer
Dave Garroway, broadcaster
Bernard Gilkey, major-league outfielder
Marty Hendin, St. Louis Cardinals former director of public relations
Ken Holtzman, two-time All Star major-league pitcher
Art Jimmerson, professional boxer
Peter Martin, jazz pianist
Ed Mickelson, major-league first baseman
Samuel Moyn, historian
Nelly, rapper
Billy Lawrence, singer
Virginia E. Palmer, United States Ambassador to Ghana
Leslie Parnas, cellist
Robert Person, major-league pitcher
Leonard Roberts, actor
Art Shamsky, major-league outfielder and Israel Baseball League manager
William Sleator, author
Tershawn Wharton, NFL player
Tennessee Williams, playwright
Lew Wolff, co-owner of the Oakland Athletics

See also 

 National Register of Historic Places listings in St. Louis County, Missouri

Notes

External links
 Official Website
 University City School District website

High schools in St. Louis County, Missouri
Public high schools in Missouri
Educational institutions established in 1930
Buildings and structures in St. Louis County, Missouri
1930 establishments in Missouri